A humanized mouse is a mouse carrying functioning human genes, cells, tissues, and/or organs. Humanized mice are commonly used as small animal models in biological and medical research for human therapeutics.

A humanized mouse or a humanized mouse model is one that has been xenotransplanted with human cells and/or engineered to express human gene products, so as to be utilized for gaining relevant insights in the in vivo context for understanding of human-specific physiology and pathologies. A lot of our knowledge about several human biological processes has been obtained from studying animal models like rodents and non-human primates. In particular, small animals such as mice are advantageous in such studies owing to their small size, brief reproductive cycle, easy handling and due to the genomic and physiological similarities with humans; moreover, these animals can also be genetically modified easily. Nevertheless, there are several incongruencies of these animal systems with those of humans, especially with regard to the components of the immune system. To overcome these limitations and to realize the full potential of animal models to enable researchers to get a clear picture of the nature and pathogenesis of immune responses mounted against human-specific pathogens, humanized mouse models have been developed. Such mouse models have also become an integral aspect of preclinical biomedical research.

History 
The discovery of the athymic mouse, commonly known as the nude mouse, and that of the SCID mouse were major events that paved the way for humanized mice models. The first such mouse model was derived by backcrossing C57BL/Ka and BALB/c mice, featuring a loss of function mutation in the PRKDC gene. The PRKDC gene product is necessary for resolving breaks in DNA strands during the development of T cells and B cells. Dysfunctional PRKDC gene leads to impaired development of T and B lymphocytes which gives rise to severe combined immunodeficiency (SCID). In spite of the efforts in developing this mouse model, poor engraftment of human hematopoietic stem cells (HSCs) was a major limitation that called for further advancement in the development humanized mouse models. The next big step in the development of humanized mice models came with transfer of the scid mutation to a non-obese diabetic mouse. This resulted in the creation of the NOD-scid mice which lacked T cells, B cells, and NK cells. This mouse model permitted for a slightly higher level of human cell reconstitution. Nevertheless, a major breakthrough in this field came with the introduction of the mutant IL-2 receptor (IL2rg) gene in the NOD-scid model. This accounted for the creation of the NOD-scid-γcnull mice (NCG, NSG or NOG) models which were found to have defective signaling of interleukins IL-2, IL-4, IL-7, IL-9, IL-15 and IL-21. Researchers evolved this NSG model by knocking out the RAG1 and RAG2 genes (recombination activation genes), resulting into the RAGnull version of the NSG model that was devoid of major cells of the immune system including the natural killer cells, B lymphocytes and T lymphocytes, macrophages and dendritic cells, causing the greatest immunodeficiency in mice models so far. The limitation with this model was that it lacked the human leukocyte antigen. In accordance to this limitation, the human T cells when engrafted in the mice, failed to recognize human antigen-presenting cells, which consequated in defective immunoglobulin class switching and improper organization of the secondary lymphoid tissue.

To circumvent this limitation, the next development came with the introduction of transgenes encoding for HLA I and HLA II in the NSG RAGnull model that enabled buildout of human T-lymphocyte repertoires as well as the respective immune responses. Mice with such human genes are technically human-animal hybrids.

Types 
Engrafting an immunodeficient mouse with functional human cells can be achieved by intravenous injections of human cells and tissue into the mouse, and/or creating a genetically modified mouse from human genes. This section highlights the various humanized mice models developed using the different methods.

Hu-PBL-scid model 
This model is developed by intravenously injecting human PBMCs into immunodeficient mice. The peripheral blood mononuclear cells to be engrafted into the model are obtained from consented adult donors. The advantages associated with this method are that it is comparatively an easy technique, the model takes relatively less time to get established and that the model exhibits functional memory T cells. It is particularly very effective for modelling graft vs. host disease. The model lacks engraftment of B lymphocytes and myeloid cells. Other limitations with this model are that it is suitable for use only in short-term experiments (<3 months) and the possibility that the model itself might develop graft vs. host disease.

Hu-SRC-scid model 
Hu-SRC-scid mice are developed by engrafting CD34+ human hematopoietic stem cells into immunodeficient mice. The cells are obtained from human fetal liver, bone marrow or from blood derived from the umbilical cord, and engrafted via intravenous injection. The advantages of this model are that it offers multilineage development of hematopoietic cells, generation of a naïve immune system, and if engraftment is carried out by intrahepatic injection of newborn mice within 72 hours of birth, it can lead to enhanced human cell reconstitution. Nevertheless, limitations associated with the model are that it takes a minimum of 10 weeks for cell differentiation to occur, it harbors low levels of human RBCs, polymorphonuclear leukocytes, and megakaryocytes.

BLT (bone marrow/liver/thymus) model 
The BLT model is constituted with human HSCs, bone marrow, liver, and thymus. The engraftment is carried out by implantation of liver and thymus under the kidney capsule and by transplantation of HSCs obtained from fetal liver. The BLT model has a complete and totally functional human immune system with HLA-restricted T lymphocytes. The model also comprises a mucosal system that is similar to that of humans. Moreover, among all models the BLT model has the highest level of human cell reconstitution.

However, since it requires surgical implantation, this model is the most difficult and time-consuming to develop. Other drawbacks associated with the model are that it portrays weak immune responses to xenobiotics, sub-optimal class switching and may develop GvHD.

Transplanted human organoids 
Bio- and electrical engineers have shown that human cerebral organoids transplanted into mice functionally integrate with their visual cortex. Such models may raise similar ethical issues as organoid-based humanization of other animals.

Mouse-human hybrid 
A mouse-human hybrid is a genetically modified mouse whose genome has both mouse and human genes, thus being a murine form of a human-animal hybrid. For example, genetically modified mice may be born with human leukocyte antigen genes in order to provide a more realistic environment when introducing human white blood cells into them in order to study immune system responses. One such application is the identification of hepatitis C virus (HCV) peptides that bind to HLA, and that can be recognized by the human immune system, thereby potentially being targets for future vaccines against HCV.

Established models for human diseases 
Several mechanisms underlying human maladies are not fully understood. Utilization of humanized mice models in this context allows researchers to determine and unravel important factors that bring about the development of several human diseases and disorders falling under the categories of infectious disease, cancer, autoimmunity, and GvHD.

Infectious diseases 
Among the human-specific infectious pathogens studied on humanized mice models, the human immunodeficiency virus has been successfully studied. Besides this, humanized models for studying Ebola virus, Hepatitis B, Hepatitis C, Kaposi's sarcoma-associated herpesvirus, Leishmania major, malaria, and tuberculosis have been reported by various studies.

NOD/scid mice models for dengue virus and varicella-zoster virus, and a Rag2null𝛾cnull model for studying influenza virus have also been developed.

Cancers 
On the basis of the type of human cells/tissues that have been used for engraftment, humanized mouse models for cancer can be classified as patient-derived xenografts or cell line-derived xenografts. PDX models are considered to retain the parental malignancy characteristics at a greater extent and hence these are regarded as the more powerful tool for evaluating the effect of anticancer drugs in pre-clinical studies. Humanized mouse models for studying cancers of various organs have been designed. A mouse model for the study of breast cancer has been generated by the intrahepatic engraftment of SK-BR-3 cells in NSG mice. Similarly, NSG mice intravenously engrafted with patient-derived AML cells, and those engrafted (via subcutaneous, intravenous or intra-pancreatic injections) with patient-derived pancreatic cancer tumors have also been developed for the study of leukemia and pancreatic cancer respectively. Several other humanized rodent models for the study of cancer and cancer immunotherapy have also been reported.

Autoimmune diseases 
Problems posed by the differences in the human and rodent immune systems have been overcome using a few strategies, so as to enable researchers to study autoimmune disorders using humanized models. NSG mice engrafted with PBMCs and administered with myelin antigens in Freund's adjuvant, and antigen-pulsed autologous dendritic cells have been used to study multiple sclerosis. Similarly, NSG mice engrafted with hematopoietic stem cells and administered with pristane have been used for studying lupus erythematosus. Furthermore, NOG mice engrafted with PBMCs has been used to study mechanisms of allografts rejection in vivo.

See also 
Nude mouse
SCID mouse
NOG mouse
NSG mouse
Mouse model of colorectal and intestinal cancer
Mouse models of breast cancer metastasis
Knockout mouse

References

Further reading 

 
 
 
 
 
 

Immunology mice